Bodoni is a surname. Notable people with the surname include:

 Gavril Bănulescu-Bodoni (1746–1821), Moldovan clergyman
 Giambattista Bodoni (1740–1813) , Italian engraver, publisher and printer, creator of the Bodoni typeface
 Giancarlo Bodoni, American Brazilian jiujitsu practitioner
 Zsolt Bodoni (born 1975), Hungarian painter

Surnames of Italian origin